Hourpes is a hamlet of Wallonia in the municipality and district of Thuin, located in the province of Hainaut, Belgium.

A notable building in the hamlet is the Château de Hourpes built about 1887, it was purchased and renovated in the 21st century allegedly using money from a Value Added Tax (VAT) fraud.

References

External links
 
 

Populated places in Hainaut (province)
Thuin